Wieber is a German surname, a variant of Weber. Notable people with the surname include:

 Jordyn Wieber (born 1995), American gymnast
 Ryan Wieber (born 1984), American visual effects compositor

German-language surnames